Jan Franciszek Miodek (born 7 June 1946 in Tarnowskie Góry, Silesian Voivodeship), is a Polish linguist, a prescriptive grammarian and a Professor of Wrocław University. He is regarded as one of the most prominent educators and promoters of the standard Polish language.

Life and career
He was born on 7 June 1946, in Tarnowskie Góry. His father was Franciszek Miodek and his mother was Janina (née Kowalska). In 1963, he graduated from the Stanisław Staszic High School No.2 in Tarnowskie Góry.

Since 1967, he has been working as a columnist in Gazeta Wrocławska newspaper, running the weekly "Rzecz o języku" linguistic column. Since 1989 he has held the post of the head (director) of the Institute of Polish Philology at the Wrocław University. Between 1987-2007, he hosted a popular weekly TV program Ojczyzna polszczyzna devoted to the Polish language. He also created such programs as Profesor Miodek odpowiada and Słownik polsko@polski.

Since 2015, he has co-hosted the Polska z Miodkiem ("Poland with Miodek") program in which he discusses the etymology of various words in the Polish language.

Awards and honours
Wojciech Korfanty Award
Wiktor Award (1988, 1991, 1998)
Superwiktor Award (1998)
Honorary degree of the Lithuanian University of Educational Sciences
Honorary degree of the Opole University
Honorary Citizen of the City of Wrocław
Honorary Citizen of the City of Tarnowskie Góry
Silver Medal for Merit to Culture – Gloria Artis (2015)

See also
List of Poles

References

1946 births
Living people
People from Tarnowskie Góry
Linguists from Poland